Ashish Kumar (born 1990) is an Indian gymnast from Allahabad, who won India's first-ever medals in gymnastics, in October 2010 at the 2010 Commonwealth Games and became the most successful Indian gymnast in Commonwealth Games history, by winning bronze and silver medals in different gymnastic events.

Competitive history

2006
Kumar first participated at the 2006 Asian Artistic Gymnastics Championships staged in Surat, India. He won the bronze medal on the Floor Exercise, tied with Syrian gymnast Fadi Bahlawan. This was India's first major international medal in the history of artistic gymnastics. Kumar also competed at the 2006 Asian Games in Doha, Qatar. He finished 18th in the individual all-around, the only final he qualified for.

2010
At the 2010 Commonwealth Games he first won a bronze medal in the floor exercise and later a silver medal on vault, where the gold went to Luke Folwell of England, while Ian Galvan of Canada won the bronze medal. 
At the 2010 Asian Games in Guangzhou, China, Kumar won the bronze medal in the floor exercise. As of 2017, this remains India's only medal in gymnastics at the Asian Games.

2011
At the South Central Asian Gymnastics Championships in Dhaka in December 2011 Kumar won four gold medals, in the individual all-around, floor exercise, vault and high bar events.

2014
Following a turbulent selection process which caused uncertainty about the participation of the Indian team in the Gymnastics event at the 2014 Asian Games, Kumar failed to qualify to the floor finals at the event. He finished 12th in the individual all-around.

References

External links
FIG profile
 Ashish Kumar Interview at NDTV

Indian male artistic gymnasts
1990 births
Living people
Sportspeople from Allahabad
Gymnasts at the 2010 Commonwealth Games
Commonwealth Games bronze medallists for India
Commonwealth Games silver medallists for India
Recipients of the Arjuna Award
Asian Games medalists in gymnastics
Gymnasts at the 2006 Asian Games
Gymnasts at the 2010 Asian Games
Gymnasts at the 2014 Asian Games
Gymnasts at the 2018 Asian Games
Asian Games bronze medalists for India
Commonwealth Games medallists in gymnastics
Medalists at the 2010 Asian Games
Gymnasts at the 2018 Commonwealth Games
Medallists at the 2010 Commonwealth Games